"There's a Place for Us" is a song co-written and recorded by American country artist Carrie Underwood for the soundtrack of the 2010 film The Chronicles of Narnia: The Voyage of the Dawn Treader. The song was performed by other artists for country-specific releases outside the United States.

The song was nominated for Best Original Song at the 68th Golden Globe Awards.

Release and reception
It was released on November 16, 2010 as the soundtrack's lead single, and can be purchased exclusively through iTunes. It has sold 77,000 copies as of January 18, 2011. The song did not enter the Billboard Hot 100 but peaked at number 7 on the Bubbling Under Hot 100 Singles extension chart. It also entered two digital charts tracked by Billboard — at number 64 on the Hot Canadian Digital Songs (component of Canadian Hot 100) and at number 11 on Country Digital Songs (component of Hot Country Songs).

Chart positions

Joe McElderry version

Joe McElderry recorded the song for a United Kingdom release. It was released on December 6, 2010 as the b-side to McElderry's "Someone Wake Me Up" where it sold over 7,000 copies. Due to Sony Music's tight recording schedule, McElderry accidentally sang "king and queen" in the chorus instead of the printed lyric, "kings and queens" (referring to the kings and queens of Narnia), although attempts were made to electronically correct this in post-production.

Chart positions
"There's a Place For Us" served as the B-Side to "Someone Wake Me Up" and thus shares its chart positions.

Versions
Various versions of the song "There's a Place for Us" are featured in international versions of the soundtrack, used to promote artists signed to Sony Music in different marketing regions. Many of these artists became famous as a result of various reality TV talent shows, such as American Idol in the case of Carrie Underwood, X Factor in the UK for Joe McElderry, and Swedish Idol in the case of E.M.D.

References

2010 singles
The Chronicles of Narnia music
Carrie Underwood songs
Songs written by Carrie Underwood
Joe McElderry songs
E.M.D. songs
Songs written by David Hodges
Pop ballads
Country ballads
Song recordings produced by Mark Bright (record producer)
Songs written by Hillary Lindsey
2010 songs
2010s ballads